Acrossocheilus multistriatus is a species of ray-finned fish in the genus Acrossocheilus. It is endemic to China, where it inhabits the Huaping National Nature Reserve in Guangxi.

References

Multistriatus
Freshwater fish of China
Endemic fauna of China
Fish described in 2014